Eugeniusz Tomasz Grzeszczak (born 29 December 1954 in Kowalewo-Opactwo) is a Polish politician. He was elected to the Sejm on 25 September 2005, getting 5,181 votes in 37 Konin district as a candidate from the Polish People's Party list.

He was also a member of Senate 1991-1993 and Senate 1993-1997.

See also
Members of Polish Sejm 2005-2007

External links
Eugeniusz Grzeszczak - parliamentary page - includes declarations of interest, voting record, and transcripts of speeches.

1954 births
Living people
Polish People's Party politicians
Deputy Marshals of the Sejm of the Third Polish Republic
Members of the Senate of Poland 1991–1993
Members of the Senate of Poland 1993–1997
Members of the Polish Sejm 2005–2007
Members of the Polish Sejm 2007–2011
Members of the Polish Sejm 2011–2015
People from Słupca County